Ciclos (English: Cycles) is the 17th studio album recorded by Nicaraguan salsa singer-songwriter Luis Enrique, The album was released by Top Stop Music on 19 May 2009 (see 2009 in music). The album became his first number-one set on the Billboard Tropical Albums chart since Una Historia Diferente in 1991.

Track listing 

 "Yo No Sé Mañana" (Jorge Luís Piloto, Jorge Villamizar) – 4:19
 "Cómo Volver a Ser Feliz" (Amaury Gutiérrez, Luis Enrique Mejia) – 4:11
 "Sonríe" (Sergio George, Mejia, Fernando Osorio) – 4:14
 "Sombras Nada Más" (Jose Maria Contursi, Francisco Lomuso) – 4:27
 "Parte de Este Juego" (Gianmarco Zignago) – 4:02
 "No Me Des la Espalda" (Gutierrez) – 4:46
 "Autobiografía" (Mejia, Piloto) – 4:34
 "Cambia" (Carlos Varela) – 4:59
 "Inocencia" (Mejia, Osorio) – 4:19
 "Abre Tus Ojos" (Mejia, Osorio ) – 3:47
 "Yo No Sé Mañana" (Piloto, Villamizar) (Pop Version) – 3:51

Credits and personnel 

 Jose Aguirre – trumpet, horn arrangements
 Carlos Álvarez – mixing
 Juan Mario Aracil "Mayito" – engineer
 Alberto Barros – trombone
 Ahmed Barroso – guitar
 Bob Benozzo – arranger, keyboards, programming, producer, engineer
 LaTisha Cotto – director
 Tom Coyne – mastering
 Leonardo Di Angilla – percussion
 Luis Enrique – guitar, percussion, Chorus
 Sergio George – arranger, producer
 Guianko Gómez – chorus
 Andrés Hernández – Photographer
 Raúl Hernández – concept, cover design
 Lee Levin – drums
 Luis Márquez – horn arrangements
 Elio Rivagli – drums
 Héctor Rubén Rivera – production coordination
 Reuben Rodríguez – bass
 Yorgis Goiricelaya – bass
 Milton Salcedo – keyboards
 José Sibaja – trumpet
 Manolito – arranger
 Rafael Solano – conga, shekere
 Andrea Valfré – engineer
 Ismael Vergara – sax
 Robert Vilera – bongos, timbals, bell 
 Sidney Swift – engineer

Charts

Weekly charts

Year-end charts

Singles

Sales and certifications

Awards

Latin Grammy Awards 

The Album received five nominations for the Latin Grammy Awards of 2009. The album won the following awards:

 Best Salsa Album: Ciclos 
 Best Tropical Song: "Yo No Sé Mañana" (Jorge Luis Piloto and Jorge Villamizar, songwriters)

The Album was also nominated for the following awards:

 Album of the Year: Ciclos
 Song of the Year: "Yo No Sé Mañana" (Jorge Luis Piloto and Jorge Villamizar, songwriters)
 Producer of the Year: Sergio George

Grammy Awards 

The Album won the following at the 2010 Grammy Awards:

 Best Tropical Latin Album

See also
List of number-one Billboard Tropical Albums from the 2000s

References 

Luis Enrique (singer) albums
2009 albums
Albums produced by Sergio George
Latin Grammy Award for Best Salsa Album
Grammy Award for Best Tropical Latin Album
Top Stop Music albums